Jacqueline is a 1956 British drama film shot in Belfast and directed by Roy Ward Baker. It is based on the novel The Grand Man (1954) by Catherine Cookson.

Plot
Steel worker Mike McNeil's drinking spirals out of control when he loses his job due to vertigo at the Belfast shipyard. But his devoted young daughter Jacqueline vows to help him. 

She is picked as soloist at a church festival and attempts to persuade a tough land-owner to give her troubled dad another chance.

Cast

Production
The film was based on the novel The Grand Man (1954) by Catherine Cookson. It was Cookson's fifth book. Cookson was paid £750 for the rights and a draft of the script. The film was set in Belfast as opposed to Tyneside which is where the novel was set. Cookson disliked the casting of Jacqueline Ryan in the lead role, feeling she was miscast. She was ultimately unhappy with the film, as she was with Rooney another adaptation from the Rank Organisation of one of her novels.

Baker said "the picture was partly made because of the introduction at that time of the blue backing process which made back projection very much easier than the old-fashioned process but it had its teething problems and difficulties. So, I boldly was the first one to use it and it worked extremely well. Again, we had an extremely good cast." 

Baker said John Gregson "was excellent for the part except he kept saying I wish I was Victor McLaglen because it needed a great big hunk of a man and John wasn't."

Jacqueline Ryan was the daughter of Phyllis Ryan, an actor and later manager.

There was some location work done in Belfast but the bulk of the film was shot at Pinewood. Ward said "Every film has its problems and with this one it was that the central character was the little girl who since she was nine had never been in front of a camera before. She'd been tested and looked at and seemed all right. But she was frightened to death. I think she thought the Duke of Wellington was going to come and put her in the Tower and leave her there. Anyway, she got through it and in the end she wasn't bad. Also, I'd never directed a child before.

Critical reception
The Observer called it "a nice, dull film."

Variety called it
A saccharine, sentimental yarn... notable for the fact that it introduces an attractive new child personality. Also that it permits most of £he other characters to indulge in large doses of conventional Irish blarney. Pic is strictly for the family trade. The story is oldfashioned in conception and presentation, and never attempts 'to be anything but dated melodrama...  The emphasis all the way is on  the tear-jerking aspects and they’re frequently very contrived. There is a limited appeal in the background and the scenes of a slum neighborhood celebrating the Coronation with a street party has some interest. The picture, however, is dominated by the moppet performer who, without precociousness, and with no previous experience, acts with genuine con¬viction and sincerity. 
Britmovie called the film "gushingly sentimental"; while Sky Movies called it "a likeable little drama with earnest performances and atmospheric background detail."

Roy Ward Baker said "the film was quite successful. It was a harmless fairy tale.
They were all good in it and they were picturesque and quite funny. "

References

External links

1956 films
1956 drama films
Northern Irish films
British drama films
Films directed by Roy Ward Baker
Films shot at Pinewood Studios
British black-and-white films
Films set in Belfast
Films shot in Northern Ireland
Films with screenplays by Patrick Kirwan
Films based on British novels
1950s English-language films
1950s British films